The following elections occurred in the year 1812.
 1812 United Kingdom general election

North America

United States
 1812 Louisiana gubernatorial election
 United States House of Representatives elections in New York, 1812
 1812 and 1813 United States House of Representatives elections
 1812 United States presidential election
 1812 and 1813 United States Senate elections

See also
 :Category:1812 elections

1812
Elections